Nick Hardy (born January 26, 1996) is an American professional golfer from Northbrook, Illinois. Hardy played college golf for the University of Illinois at Urbana–Champaign men's golf team He has also played at the professional level in the U.S. Open and in the John Deere Classic. In addition, Hardy has won a number of junior championship events both in the state of Illinois and nationally.

High school and junior amateur career 
During his high school years, Hardy had a number of noteworthy performances. When he wasn't competing and or playing for his high school, he most frequently competed in the American Junior Golf Association (AJGA) and their tournaments. In 2012, Hardy had a number of good showings in multiple events. In the Stonehenge Junior Open, which is an event on the AJGA circuit, Hardy tied for 9th place and in the same year, tied for 4th position in the Exide Technologies Junior Open. Lastly, in 2012, Hardy capped off the year at the Jones Cup Junior Invitational with final rounds of 69 and 71, which put him in a tie for second place.

Moving into 2013, Hardy began to find his way into more prestigious events. In the 2013 AJGA Stonehenge Open, Hardy shot rounds of 69, 70, and 63 to seal the victory. In the same year, Hardy qualified for two notable tournaments in the form of the U.S. Amateur and the Illinois State Junior Championship. In the U.S. Amateur, Hardy opened with a round of 65 (−5) and advanced to the match play round of 64. Hardy earned a second place finish in the Illinois State Junior Amateur Championship in 2013, an event put on by the Chicago District Golf Association (CDGA).

While playing for his high school of Glenbrook North, Hardy helped the team to a number of runs at the state championship. He graduated as a member of the class of 2014. In the class of 2014, Hardy was considered the 14th best golfer in the nation. At the state level, Hardy found himself ranked the number two junior amateur golfer in Illinois by the AJGA.

Freshman year of college 
Hardy played as a freshman for the Fighting Illini during the 2014–15 season. He recorded a season stroke average of 72.9 and racked up five top-20 finishes on the season. Hardy won the Big Ten Freshman of the Year award, was a first-team All-Big Ten player his freshman year, and was a co-champion at the Big Ten Championship.

2015 U.S. Open 
Hardy qualified for the 2015 U.S. Open at Chambers Bay in Washington state via local and sectional qualifying.

At the U.S. Open, Hardy was the last player playing on the second day and his missed putt for par on the 36th hole moved the cut line from +4 to +5 and allowed and additional 15 players to make the cut. On the final day of the tournament, Hardy shot a round of 68 (−2) for the day and finished the tournament at +10 in 52nd place.

Sophomore year of college 
Over the course of the fall golf season for Illinois, Hardy recorded a stroke average of 71.66 which was the second best on the team. During the fall season, Hardy had 8 out of 12 rounds in which he shot under or even par. In the four concluding tournaments of the regular season, Hardy earned top-10 finishes in all of them. Hardy earned a top 20 finish in the Big Ten Championship. At the NCAA Championships, Hardy individually tied for 36th place. By the end of the spring season, Hardy's stroke average was 72.78.

Summer 2016 
During the summer of 2016, Hardy once again qualified for the U.S. Open, held at Oakmont Country Club. He missed the cut by four stokes. In addition to playing in the U.S. Open, Hardy won the Illinois State Amateur with a record score of 260 (−28).

Junior year of college 
In the fall season, Hardy ended up recording four top-5 finishes, and in six out of the 12 rounds he played, Hardy shot a score that was under par. In addition to what he accomplished for his school, Hardy was selected to play for team USA in the Arnold Palmer Cup, where he won both of his singles matches. During the spring time season, Hardy recorded a total of six top-10 finishes, and among those was a 6th place finish at the Big  Ten Championship and he would also receive All-Big Ten First Team honors in 2017. Hardy also won the NCAA West Lafayette Regional. By winning he became only the fourth regional medalist in the history of the University of Illinois.

Amateur wins
2013 AJGA Stonehenge Junior Open
2015 Big Ten Championship (tied with Carson Schaake)
2016 Illinois State Amateur, Wolf Run Intercollegiate
2017 NCAA West Lafayette Regional (tied with Andrej Bevins)
2018 Big Ten Championship

Source:

Playoff record
Korn Ferry Tour playoff record (0–1)

Results in major championships
Results not in chronological order in 2020.

CUT = missed the half-way cut
"T" = tied
NT = No tournament due to the COVID-19 pandemic

Results in The Players Championship

U.S. national team appearances
Amateur
Arnold Palmer Cup: 2017 (winners)

See also
2021 Korn Ferry Tour Finals graduates
2022 Korn Ferry Tour Finals graduates

References

External links

American male golfers
PGA Tour golfers
Illinois Fighting Illini men's golfers
Korn Ferry Tour graduates
People from Northbrook, Illinois
1996 births
Living people